Leichenschmaus (English: Funeral Feast) is the first studio album by the German DJ and producer Florian Senfter (a.k.a. Zombie Nation and Splank!) who worked together on his debut album with Emanuel Günther (a.k.a. Mooner). It was released in the beginning of 1999 on DJ Hell's label, International DeeJay Gigolo Records.

The front cover is a flipped image of the baby that is used on the front cover of Nirvana's 1991 album Nevermind.

History 
This first Zombie Nation record contained the song "Kernkraft 400", German for "Nuclear Power 400,". The song samples a track from the 1984 Commodore 64 game Lazy Jones by David Whittaker called "Star Dust". Soon after the first independent release in 1999 the song developed into an underground hit in European clubs, and was licensed to various countries including a more commercial remix version by Italian remix-producer DJ Gius.

Track listing

Singles 
 Kernkraft 400 (1999)

References

External links 
 Official Website from Zombie Nation
 Official Website from Mooner
 

Zombie Nation (band) albums
1999 debut albums
Techno albums by German artists